"I Refuse to Lose" is a song recorded by James Brown. Released as a single in 1976, it charted #47 R&B. It also appeared on the album Get Up Offa That Thing.

References

James Brown songs
1976 singles
Polydor Records singles
1976 songs